Jugnu is a 1947 Indian musical romantic comedy film directed and produced by Shaukat Hussain Rizvi. 

The film stars Dilip Kumar and Noor Jehan in lead roles with Ghulam Mohammad, Jillo, Latika, Shashikala in supporting roles. It also features a cameo appearance by Mohammed Rafi. It revolves around Suraj, the son of a rich landlord and Jugnu, an orphan, who fall in love with each other. 

Jugnu was released on 23 May 1947, and faced controversies because of its way of depicting romance. The elitarian society including film critics even demanded the film to be banned. Despite these protests, the film was praised for its actors' performances, and became a major commercial success, becoming the highest-grossing Indian film of 1947. The film was Dilip Kumar's first major hit and marked the beginning of his stardom.

Cast

Male
 Dilip Kumar as Suraj
 Zia
 Laddan
 Sanger 
 Agha
 Nazir Kashmiri
 Munawwar Agha Najni
 Ghulam Mohamad as Sooraj's father
	
Female
 Noorjahan as Jugnu
 Latika as Jugnu's friend
 Parveen
 Shashikala as Suraj's sister
 Farha
 Indoo
 Hoorbanoo
 Jilloo bai as Suraj's mother

Music

Release
Jugnu was released on 23 May 1947. The film was conceptualized and filmed in pre-independence India however, the film's censored version was  subsequently released after the partition. The film drew significant controversy upon release, for two major reasons. The first reason was its depiction of romance, flirting and dancing on a college campus setting, which led to negative reviews from film critics. This led to 28 minutes of content being censored by the Indian government. The second reason was the film's director Rizvi and lead actress Noor Jehan becoming Pakistanis after the partition of India.

Critical reception 
In 1948, the biggest Indian film magazine at the time, Filmindia, was very critical of the film. The magazine's editor, film critic Baburao Patel, wrote a negative review, calling Jugnu a "dirty, disgusting, vulgar picture!" Patel stated, it "tells us that college life in India is nothing more than a long sex hunt in which boys chase girls, explore their hand bags, rob their tiffin boxes and sing suggestive love ditties while making vulgar gestures; while girls sigh about heavily, seduce boys to tea, pimp for their friends, puncture their cycle tyres and sing songs of frustrated love," and added, "no decent exhibitor with any pride for his profession or any self-respect should exhibit it in his theatre." He also criticized the director Rizvi for becoming a Pakistani national, falsely accusing him of having connections with Hyderabad State separatist Kasim Razvi. Another 1948 Filmindia editorial attacked Muslim filmmakers such as Rizvi for working in both India and Pakistan, stating "censors must watch carefully such anti-social and anti-religious activities of these fanatic producers who live with us to stab us from day to day," while referencing Jugnu as an example.

Box office 
Jugnu (1947 film) grossed 50 lakh (US$5 million) in India, making it the highest-grossing Indian film of 1947. When adjusted for inflation, its gross in 2016 value is equivalent to 363 crore (US$ million). This is the highest for any Indian film at the time, until it was surpassed by Andaz, which also stars Kumar in lead role along with Nargis and Raj Kapoor.

Notes

References

External links 
 

1947 films
1940s Hindi-language films
Indian musical drama films
1940s musical drama films
Indian black-and-white films
1947 drama films